First Impact is the debut extended play (EP) by South Korean girl group Kep1er, a project group formed through the 2021 Mnet reality competition show Girls Planet 999. The album was released on January 3, 2022, by Wake One Entertainment. It is available in three versions: "Connect 0", "Connect -" and "Connect 1", and contains six tracks with "Wa Da Da" as its lead single.

Background and release
Kep1er was formed through the Mnet reality survival show Girls Planet 999, which aired from August 6 to October 22, 2021. The show brought 99 contestants from China, Japan and South Korea to compete to debut in a multinational girl group. Out of initially 99 contestants, only the top nine would be in the final debut lineup.

Kep1er was originally scheduled to debut on December 14, 2021, with their first EP First Impact, with pre-orders beginning on November 29. However, it was announced that the group's scheduled debut had been delayed to January 3, 2022, due to one of their staff members having tested positive for COVID-19. On December 14, it was revealed that group members Mashiro and Xiaoting tested positive for COVID-19. On December 26, Kep1er's agency announced that Xiaoting and Mashiro have fully recovered from COVID-19.

On January 3, 2022, Kep1er released their debut EP First Impact with "Wa Da Da" serving as the lead single.

Critical reception

Gladys Yeo from NME gave extended play three out of five stars, calling the EP an energetic six-track project record that makes for an enjoyable listen but falls short in fleshing out Kep1er's identity as an act. She commented how individually, the songs on the EP can be enjoyable and how this allows the group members to show off their vocal abilities, but falters when it comes to cohesion and establishing the group's identity.

Track listing

Charts

Weekly charts

Monthly charts

Year-end charts

Certifications

Release history

References

External links
 

Kep1er albums
2022 debut EPs
Korean-language EPs
Genie Music EPs
Wake One Entertainment EPs